Vences is a surname. Notable people with the surname include:

Alejandro Vences (born 1990), Mexican footballer
Guillermina Casique Vences (born 1961), Mexican politician
Miguel Vences (born 1969), German herpetologist and evolutionary biologist

See also
Vence, a French commune